The Great Australian Bake Off is an Australian television baking series that is based on the BBC baking competition The Great British Bake Off.

The series first premiered on 9 July 2013 on the Nine Network and ran for one season with presenters Shane Jacobson and Anna Gare and judges Dan Lepard and Kerry Vincent. On 1 April 2015 it was announced that the series had been picked up by pay television channel Lifestyle Food and production company FremantleMedia Australia for a second season which premiered on 13 October 2015 with presenters Claire Hooper and Mel Buttle and judges Maggie Beer and Matt Moran. Another 3 seasons aired on Lifestyle Food and Lifestyle between 2016 and 2019.

In December 2020, there was speculation the series was to be picked up by the Seven Network for its sixth season, however in March 2021, Foxtel was in “advanced discussions” for a series return. In June 2021, it was officially renewed by Foxtel with auditions open from June to 18 July 2021, with BBC Studios Australia taking over production from Fremantle Australia. The sixth season premiered on 27 January 2022. 

On 4 August 2022, Foxtel announced a new-look seventh season had been commissioned, to air in 2023 with filming commencing in September. Maggie Beer, Matt Moran, Claire Hooper and Mel Buttle are departing the show, with new judges and hosts to be announced. On 30 August 2022 Foxtel revealed pastry chef Darren Purchese and culinary expert Rachel Khoo as the show’s new judges, with comedians Cal Wilson and Natalie Tran to host.

Format
The programme operates on a weekly elimination process to find the best all-round baker from the contestants who are all amateurs, where in each episode the bakers are tasked with 3 different challenges; a signature bake, a technical bake and a show-stopper. The bakes are critically examined by the judges who will then choose a "Baker of the week" and a baker that is eliminated from the competition. Ten contestants were chosen for the first season.

Signature Challenge: This challenge is for the amateur bakers to show off their tried-and-tested recipes that are rustic and altogether home-made-looking.
Technical Challenge: This challenge shows who can follow instructions, but who also has the technical knowledge and experience to produce the finished product. The bakers are all given the same recipe and are not told beforehand what the challenge will be. The finished product is ranked from worst to best, with the judges not knowing who produced which.
Showstopper Challenge: This challenge is for the bakers to show off their skills and talent. The judges are looking for a bake that is both of a professional appearance but also in taste.

Hosts and judges

Season overview

Season 1 (2013)

Season 1 of The Great Australian Bake Off saw ten home bakers take part in a bake-off to test their baking skills as they battled to be crowned The Great Australian Bake Off's best amateur baker. Each week saw the bakers put through three challenges in a particular discipline.

The three finalists were Jonathan Gurfinkel, Maria Vella and Nancy Ho. On 27 August 2013, Nancy Ho was crowned the best amateur baker.

Season 2 (2015)

Season 2 of The Great Australian Bake Off will see twelve home bakers take part in a bake-off to test their baking skills as they battled to be crowned The Great Australian Bake Off's best amateur baker. The 10-part season will premiere on 13 October 2015.

The three finalists were Jasmin Hartley, Sian Redgrave and Suzy Stefanidis. On 15 December 2015, Sian was crowned the best amateur baker.

Season 3 (2016)

Season 3 of The Great Australian Bake Off will see twelve home bakers take part in a bake-off to test their baking skills as they battled to be crowned The Great Australian Bake Off's best amateur baker. The 10-part season will premiere on 11 October 2016.

The three finalists were Monica Cavallaro, Olivia McMahon and Antonio Marcona. On 13 December 2016, Olivia was crowned the best amateur baker.

Season 4 (2018)

Production on season 4 of the series began in May 2017. It premiered on 18 January 2018, and moved from Lifestyle Food to the main LifeStyle channel.

The three finalists were Claudia Anton, Barb Dunn & Dave Yan. On 22 March 2018, Claudia was crowned the best amateur baker.

Season 5 (2019)

Season 5 of The Great Australian Bake Off will see twelve home bakers take part in a bake-off to test their baking skills as they battled to be crowned The Great Australian Bake Off's best amateur baker. The 10-part season premiered on 3 October 2019.

Season 6 (2022)

Season 6 of The Great Australian Bake Off will see twelve home bakers take part in a bake-off to test their baking skills as they battled to be crowned The Great Australian Bake Off's best amateur baker. The 10-part season premiered on 27 January 2022.

Season 7 (2023) 
Season 7 of The Great Australian Bake Off has been announced and will air in 2023.

Ratings

Broadcast

References

External links 
 The Great Australian Bake Off
 The Great Australian Bake Off on Bakers Corner website
 
 

 
Nine Network original programming
2013 Australian television series debuts
2010s Australian reality television series
Australian cooking television series
Television series by Fremantle (company)
Television series by BBC Studios
Television shows set in Victoria (Australia)
Television shows set in Sydney
Australia
Australian television series based on British television series
2020s Australian reality television series